The women's 100 metres hurdles at the 2004 Summer Olympics as part of the athletics program were held at the Athens Olympic Stadium from August 22 to 24.

The top two runners in each of the initial five heats automatically qualified for the semifinals. The next six fastest runners from across the heats also qualified. There were two semifinal heats, and only the top four from each heat advanced to the final. Two time  Olympic 100 meter gold medalist and defending world champion at 100 meter hurdles Gail Devers continued her run of Olympic misfortune in the hurdles, falling with a calf injury at the first hurdle of her first-round heat.

Joanna Hayes led through all the rounds, her closest competitor, Perdita Felicien.  In the final, Felicien crashed the first hurdle with her lead leg, falling to her right and taking out Irina Shevchenko along with her.  In the lane to her left, Hayes zoomed away from the field unabated, challenged by American teammate Melissa Morrison through the first four hurdles, which Morrison clipped, almost turned sideways to keep her balance and slowing through the next two hurdles.  Lacena Golding-Clarke and Olena Krasovska battled on the inside of the track.  As Krasovska began to edge ahead for the silver, Clarke slowed over the last four hurdles while Morrison battled back to take the bronze.

Records
, the existing World and Olympic records were as follows.

The following records were established during the competition:

Qualification
The qualification period for athletics was 1 January 2003 to 9 August 2004. For the women's 100 metres hurdles, each National Olympic Committee was permitted to enter up to three athletes that had run the race in 12.96 seconds or faster during the qualification period. If an NOC had no athletes that qualified under that standard, one athlete that had run the race in 13.11 seconds or faster could be entered.

Schedule
All times are Greece Standard Time (UTC+2)

Results

Round 1
Qualification rule: The first two finishers in each heat (Q) plus the next six fastest overall runners (q) advanced to the semifinals.

Heat 1
Wind: −1.2 m/s

Heat 2
Wind: −0.9 m/s

Heat 3
Wind: 0.0 m/s

Heat 4
Wind: −1.4 m/s

Heat 5
Wind: −0.9 m/s

Semifinals
Qualification rule: The first four finishers in each heat (Q) moved on to the final.

Semifinal 1
Wind: +1.7 m/s

Semifinal 2
Wind: +1.9 m/s

Final
Wind: +1.5 m/s

References

External links
 IAAF Athens 2004 Olympic Coverage

W
Sprint hurdles at the Olympics
2004 in women's athletics
Women's events at the 2004 Summer Olympics